Yesyutkino is a rural locality (a village) in Yurovskoye Rural Settlement, Gryazovetsky District, Vologda Oblast, Russia. The population was 9 as of 2002.

Geography 
Yesyutkino is located 29 km northwest of Gryazovets (the district's administrative centre) by road. Korotygino is the nearest rural locality.

References 

Rural localities in Gryazovetsky District